Verdú is a surname. Notable people with the surname include:

Joan Verdú (born 1983), Spanish footballer
José María Sánchez-Verdú (born 1968), Spanish composer
Julián Verdú (1780 - 1846), Spanish painter
Maribel Verdú (born 1970), Spanish actor
Sergio Verdú (born 1958), Spanish academic
Vicente Verdú (born 1942), Spanish writer, journalist and economist